The blue-winged minla (Actinodura cyanouroptera), also known as the blue-winged siva, is a species of bird in the family Leiothrichidae.

It has in the past been placed in the genus Minla and also in the monotypic Siva.

It is found in the Indian subcontinent and Southeast Asia, ranging across Bangladesh, Bhutan, Cambodia, China, India, Laos, Malaysia, Myanmar, Nepal, Thailand, Tibet, and Vietnam. Its natural habitat is subtropical or tropical moist montane forests.

References

blue-winged minla
Birds of South China
Birds of Nepal
Birds of Bhutan
Birds of Northeast India
Birds of Southeast Asia
blue-winged minla
Taxonomy articles created by Polbot
Taxobox binomials not recognized by IUCN